Oswaldo da Silva (14 January 1926 – 25 March 1997), commonly known as Baltazar, was a Brazilian footballer. Nicknamed Cabecinha de Ouro (Golden Head) by fans, he played as a striker.

Club career
Baltazar played for União Monte Alegre, Jabaquara, Corinthians, Juventus and União Paulista.

International career
He also represented Brazilian team who participated in the 1950 World Cup and 1954 World Cup, he played 4 matches, scoring 3 goals 2 against Mexico and one against Switzerland.. He is the only player to score in two different opening world cup matches being one goal in 1950 and the other in 1954.

He died in São Paulo aged 71.

References

External links

1926 births
1997 deaths
Sportspeople from Santos, São Paulo
Brazilian footballers
Association football forwards
1950 FIFA World Cup players
1954 FIFA World Cup players
Sport Club Corinthians Paulista players
Clube Atlético Juventus players
Brazil international footballers